State Highway 48 (SH 48) is a State Highway in Kerala, India that starts in Ayoor and ends in Punalur. The highway is 19.1 km long.

The Route Map 
Ayoor-Anchal (joins Hill Highway SH 59)

See also 
Roads in Kerala
List of State Highways in Kerala

References 

State Highways in Kerala
Roads in Kollam district